Shelby County R-IV School District is a school district headquartered in Shelbina, Missouri. It serves Shelbina and Clarence.

Its schools:
Shelbina Elementary School (PK-05)
Clarence Elementary School (PK-05)
South Shelby Middle School (06-08)
South Shelby High School (09-12)

In April 2018, Shelby County R-IV voters passed a tax increase issue to construct a new consolidated elementary school building. The new school will replace the current buildings located in Shelbina, and Clarence, and move all elementary students to a new building at the Middle/High School campus, located west of Shelbina. The new elementary is currently under construction, and is scheduled to be operational for the 2020–2021 school year.

References

External links
 

School districts in Missouri
Shelby County, Missouri